This is a list of all United States Supreme Court cases from volume 496 of the United States Reports:

External links

1990 in United States case law